Buscemi (IPA: / buʃˈʃɛmi /; Buxema / buʃˈʃɛma / in Sicilian) is an Italian town of 968 inhabitants of the free municipal consortium of Syracuse in Sicily.

Origin of the name
The usually offered translation of the original Arabic name is 'Castello di quel dal neo', or 'Castle of the man with the mole'.

The term qalʾat  means 'castle', 'fortress', which denotes the significant strategic and military position that Buscemi possessed in the past and which it still demonstrates today by means of an excellent view of the Anapo valley.

This word was often used figuratively to associate a person with some object or activity. Therefore, rather than literally 'father', it can also take on the meanings of 'the one with', 'that which is', 'he who always'.

Šāma  is instead the object referred to and it means very simply 'neo'. According to some scholars 'the man with the mole' would be a reference to the Prophet Mohammed.

Over the centuries the name has been Latinized as Abu Xamah or Abuxama or even Abisama. The Latinized version Buxemae and Bussemae, from the Norman period, however, is the one closest to today's form.

In Sicilian it is currently called Buxema / Buscema and its inhabitants are called buximisi / buscimisi.

Buscemi (and Buscema) is also a very common surname in Sicily, especially in the eastern part.

Physical Geography 
Buscemi is located 50 kilometers west of Syracuse, 45 north of Ragusa and 70 south of Catania. The town is located on the southern slope of Monte Vignitti (788 m a.s.l.), located in the central part of the Iblei Mountains, between the relief of Contessa district and the Anapo river and is surrounded by the historic sites of ancient Akrai, Casmene and the Necropolis of Pantalica. The closest municipalities to reach are Buccheri and Palazzolo Acreide which are both less than ten kilometers away.

It is the thirteenth municipality of the province by extension of the territory with 51 km2, although the inhabited center extends only for just over 1 km2. Furthermore, still within the province of belonging, it is the municipality with the greatest maximum altitude (987 m a.s.l.), the third most westerly based on the municipal house (longitude: 14.8847; preceded by Buccheri and Francofonte) and the third with the greatest altitude range (655 m).

History 
The history of the town dates back to the Bronze Age, of which Paolo Orsi identified some settlements. The Rovereto archaeologist also found the site of ancient Casmene (Κασμέναι, Kasménai). It was Thucydides who spoke of the foundation of the Greek colony, dating back to 644 BC:The first proto-urban settlement of the place most likely dates back to the Byzantine period, on the same site where the inhabited center currently stands. The rock church of San Pietro and another rock church used as an oil mill in the last century remain from this period. The first historical sources that speak of a fortress occur during the period of Arab domination. The most significant trace was given by the geographer Idrisi in his Book of Ruggero in which he mentions a Fort dedicated to the one with the neo which therefore certifies the existence of the castrum already before 1154. During the Norman period this fort was rebuilt by Riccardo Montalto on the ruins of the Muslim fort after 1313. During the devastating earthquake of 1693, Buscemi was completely razed to the ground making it one of the worst hit villages with the disappearance of 41% of the inhabitants. With the reconstruction of the inhabited center, moved from the previous site, the contemporary Buscemi was born with examples of religious and civil Baroque architecture.

Some families who held the possession of Buscemi were the Ventimiglia and the Requesens or Requisenz: of the latter only the ruins of the castle at the entrance to the town remain.

In 1777 the French painter and architect Jean Houel visited the country, who left a precise description in his Voyage:

Monuments and places of interest

Religious architectures

Church of the Nativity of the Holy Mary 
The church dedicated to the Nativity of Maria SS. it is the Mother Church of the town and certainly one of the most beautiful and harmonious in the Hyblaea

n territory. The design of the three-order façade, clearly Baroque in style, was attributed to Francesco Maria Sortino who completed it in 1769, as can be seen from the keystone of the large bell tower.

The statues that crown externally the first order (two angels) and the second (on the left St. Peter, on the right St. Paul) are rather crude and of popular taste, wrapped in stiff and heavy cloaks, characterized by a blocked gesture and a awkward expression. The floral decoration on the friezes, on the central area and on the scrolls is elegantly made, as are the harmonious capitals. The large central window is dominated by the bas-relief of the Madonna in bands that seals the church's dedication to the Nativity of Mary Most Holy. The alternation of straight and circular columns, prominent and recessed, favors a wonderful chiaroscuro effect. The central door is characterized by a lowered arch flanked by two bas-reliefs depicting the heads of a man and a woman, probably the Requisenz princes who sponsored the reconstruction.

The interior with a basilica plan, divided into three naves delimited by Corinthian-style columns and pilasters, preserves valuable paintings and sculptures that mostly date back to the seventeenth and eighteenth centuries. It is possible to admire an ancient baptismal font dated 1558 and a glass case with the embalmed body of St. Pius Martyr inside and a glass vial containing His blood, donated in 1762 by Clement XIII to protect the Buscemesi from terrible seismic events. of the area; it was taken from the Catacombs of San Callisto in Rome (in reality there is no attestation regarding this saint at the Pontifical Congregation so it is believed probable that Pius was not the real name of the martyr but an attribute due to his holiness). Today it preserves the painting "The Adoration of the Magi", a work by Mario Minniti originally kept in the church of Saint Sebastian Martyr.

Church of Saint James 
In some documents of the time it appears that the church was built in 1610 by the master builders Marco de Farioro and Antonino Calcararo, according to the project of master Pietro Costantino. It has an original convex façade of neoclassical inspiration, but in it we can find a mixture of baroque and neoclassical taste; in the second order there is an ancient clock, which for centuries has marked time with its strokes, which was added or replaced at a later time.

The interior is characterized by a large ovoid room and a square apse, harmonized by a series of arches and windows. whose plan is elliptical with an oval atrium and rectangular apse. in which there is the stone representation of the Holy Spirit, the original titular of the church. After the unification of Italy it was among the ecclesiastical assets acquired from the municipal state property, which is why it is now deconsecrated: it is part of the municipal complex and is used as a conference room, cultural initiatives and exhibitions.

The church has been restored and is now part of the municipal complex, thus being used as a conference room, cultural initiatives and exhibitions and home to the council chamber and the municipal library.

Church of Saint Anthony 
The church of Saint Anthony of Padova, improperly called "Sant'Antonino", has very ancient origins, certainly before 1586 when an organ was commissioned to Don Stefano Raniolo of Ragusa; it was rebuilt, after the catastrophic earthquake of 1693, still here, in the same place. Rebuilt in baroque style on the ruins of the previous medieval building as early as 1708, designed by the architect Nunzio De Caro and completed by the master builders Costantino Cultrara of Ragusa and Carmelo Ierna in 1765. It seems that the facade should have been in three orders, but it was only the first rebuilt (due to lack of money).

The interior has splendid baroque decorations formed by battlements and geometric garlands carved in bas-relief and decorated with superb polychrome stuccoes of the Serpottian school (by the master Serpotta, a skilled eighteenth-century plasterer), which were once all covered in pure gold. To admire the votive altars decorated with Baroque ornaments (Corinthian columns, lacy tympanums, etc.) bearing important works of art of the time; in one of them there is the statue of the "Our Lady of Sorrows" dated 1732, the work of the sculptor Filippo Quattrocchi from Catania.

Of particular interest is a canvas of the size of the entire central nave, which is exhibited in the Easter period, depicting "The Way of the Cross", the work of the Ragusan painter Pietro Quintavalle of the mid-19th century; The ancient eighteenth-century organ, the work of the organ builder "Donato Del Piano", freshly restored and currently in operation, the Putridarium, and some tombs of members of the Requesenz family are also of valuable workmanship: this in fact is the votive church of the homonymous family.

Church of Saint Sebastian Martyr 

According to the popular rumor, the most beautiful church in Buscemi: it was the richest of all churches. From the stories of the elders, it was a church frequented by nobles and aristocrats for the most part, and it too was razed to the ground following the earthquake of 1693 and completely rebuilt; there is news of an ancient brotherhood of Saint Sebastian, directed by a certain Don Giovanni Requisenz, who was in charge of administering the church's assets and who also governed the post-earthquake reconstruction.

It was rebuilt in the same place but for unknown reasons there was a second collapse of the facade; the reconstruction works took a very long time, perhaps due to limited financial resources, which was completed only in 1906. It is located in the center of the town aligned with the church of San Giacomo and raised to obtain an effect of momentum. The front terrace is closed by a wrought iron gate guarded by two stone lions.

Inside were kept a statue of Christ at the Column, the statue of the Our Lady d'Itria (or Odigitria), the first patroness of Buscemi, a wax baby (today in the Mother Church), Saint Joseph (today in Saint Anthony), a canvas of commendable artistic workmanship depicting "The Martyrdom of Sebastian" by an unknown author, and the most important, "The Adoration of the Magi", an oil on canvas (243cm x 196cm) made between 1624 and 1625 during his period Syracusan by Mario Minniti, friend, collaborator, model (subject of the famous "Child with a basket of fruit") and lover of the most talked about painter of all time: Caravaggio. The work, saved from the rubble of the 1693 earthquake, has chromatic features, gestures and glimpses, which can be traced in other works made with certainty by the Caravaggio painter. The two canvases are today in the Mother Church. The church is currently being restored.

Church of Our Lady of Mount Carmel 
Once called the church of Santa Maria Annunziata, with the adjoining convent of San Domenico, it is one of the oldest churches in the country. It is known that the construction work on the inside of the church started in 1572 by the master builder Antonino Costantino, and 30 years later, in 1602, the bell was placed and the chapel of the SS. Crucifix. It has a simple, essential and incomplete facade, almost reminiscent of the Romanesque style, and the interior consists of a single nave.

Inside, an ancient wooden statue of the Crucifix from 1700, although in the village the memories of the elderly tell of a connection with Saint Sebastian di Melilli, more precisely it is said that the two statues belong to the same sculptor. The celebrations of the Protector of Buscemi take place every first Sunday in May; this is the festival with the oldest origin in the country.

The church preserves a marble annunciation from the Gagini school, paintings by Paolo Tanasi and an ancient canvas with the effigy of the Madonna del Bosco, similar to the ancient fresco kept in the Sanctuary. Located in the lower part of the town, it was annexed to the convent of Saint Dominic, complete with nuns of the Dominican order until recently.

Sanctuary of Our Lady of the Forest 
Rebuilt after the earthquake in the same place, it is the only church outside the town left after the earthquake. The church consists of only one nave and has a fresco of the Madonna del Bosco inside, which legend has it that it was miraculously found by two deaf and dumb monks. In 1693 everything collapsed, but by divine will, the sacred icon was saved thanks to the crossing of two beams right above it.

The current sanctuary consists of a single nave with pilasters with an Ionic capital that support a thin entablature; recent is the restoration, started by the parish priest, who illuminated the barrel vault and the small dome of the church with thin cornices and some gilded squiggles. Inside the sanctuary there is a statue of Our Lady of the Forest, recreated on the basis of the fresco before the last restoration, at the end of the 18th century; on May 18, 1919 she was crowned Patroness of Buscemi and from that moment there are many actions that have made believers and non-believers cry out to the miracle.

On the last Sunday of August the evocative feast of her takes place in her honor; in 2019, for the centenary of Patrona di Buscemi, the simulacrum was restored and brought to its former glory.

Rock Church of Saint Peter 
It represents one of the few Byzantine monuments present in eastern Sicily. Paolo Orsi explored and described it in 1899. It is located four kilometers from Buscemi in the valley called Cava di Saint Rosalie. In 1855 Vito Amico noted the presence of "many sacred images in Greek style" and an ancient image of Saint Mark in addition to the one recently identified as that of Saint Sophie. Of these images, very few traces remain today. The church consists of a rectangular room supported by four large pillars, carved out of the rock, of which the first two are shaped, in the upper part, in the shape of a Doric-inspired capital. The room for the celebration of religious rites is obtained on the right side, raised by two steps, with an altar and a chair also obtained from the living rock.

Fresco of Our Lady of the Forest 
Legend has it that one day two deaf-mute friars, intent on making themselves understood, presented themselves to the bus-bus people, which, however, initially did not try to understand what the two were trying to say; here between gestures and guttural sounds, they convinced the Buscemese, equipped with obvious tools, to enter the forest. After a modest stretch of thick vegetation, they came to a small wall illuminated by a light, where there is what is now the symbol of the town: the Madonna del Bosco. The people of Buscemese, incredulous and excited, decided to erect a sanctuary in honor of Ella, but there was the problem of the lack of water nearby: a problem solved by the two friars who, a few meters from the icon, dug two graves and made a spring gush out. crystal clear water (miraculous for many faithful). In the process of thanking the two protagonists for the two miracles, those present there were amazed at the fact that the two friars had disappeared.

The image that emerged after the last restoration of the fresco is clearly of the sixteenth-century matrix and in terms of style and colors it recalls the frescoes of the Upper Basilica of Assisi made by Cimabue and Giotto in the '300. The icon sees the smiling Our Lady holding Her Son on her right leg, while in Her left hand it is possible to see a pomegranate, a symbol of fertility, which was previously a small globe. Unfortunately, time has destroyed some parts of the original painting.

Civil Architectures

Ruins of the Requisenz family castle and the Capuchin convent 
Probably of Arab foundation, it stands on the top of the hill called Monte from which it dominates a stupendous landscape of the Anapo valley, flanked by the ruins of the convent of San Francesco, built after the earthquake of 1693 and which are currently generically referred to as a castle or in Buscemese dialect "casteddu".

Casmene

Casmene was a Syracusan colony in the immediate hinterland, in a strategic position for the control of central Sicily, and used as a military outpost on the internal road that led from Syracuse to Selinunte. It was brought to light in the early twentieth century by Paolo Orsi. Located on Monte Casale it is located at 830 m above sea level, near Monte Lauro.

References

Municipalities of the Province of Syracuse